The Golf Croquet World Championships is the major golf croquet championship competition organised by the World Croquet Federation. The competition has been held annually between 1996-1998 and biennially since then. A team version has been held every 4 years since 2012. Egypt has been the most successful nation in this form of croquet.

Venues

Medallists

References

 
 

Recurring sporting events established in 1996